The Lithuania men's national field hockey team represents Lithuania in men's international field hockey competitions.

Tournament record

EuroHockey Championship III
2017 – 6th place
2019 – 7th place
2021 – 6th place

EuroHockey Championship IV
2007 – 4th place
2015 –

Hockey World league 
2014–15 – Round 1
2016–17 – Round 1

FIH Hockey Series
2018–19 – First round

See also
Lithuania women's national field hockey team
Soviet Union men's national field hockey team

References

External links 
 Lithuanian Field Hockey Federation

Field hockey
European men's national field hockey teams
National team
Men's sport in Lithuania